On 15 June 1858, 21 Christian residents of Jeddah, which was then an Ottoman town of 5,000 predominantly Muslim inhabitants, were massacred, including the French consul M. Eveillard and his wife, and the British vice-consul Stephen Page, by "some hundreds of Hadramites, inhabitants of Southern Arabia". 24 others, mostly Greeks, some "under British protection" plus the daughter of the French consul Elise Eveillard and the French interpreter M. Emerat, both badly wounded, escaped and took refuge, some by swimming to it, in the steam paddle wheel frigate .

Whereas The Church of England quarterly review (1858) suggested there could be a vague connection to the British suppression of the Indian Rebellion of 1857–1859, and The Spectator wrote that "A Sheik from Delhi is said to have instigated the massacre", the Perth Gazette of 22 October 1858 extensively quoted an interview in the Moniteur of M. Emerat, the French dragoman (interpreter) and chancellor. According to him, the events were provoked by a commercial dispute which ended by the rehoisting of the British flag on an Indian ship and the hauling down of the Ottoman one, which provoked a riot. He added that the "agitators" actually resented the presence of non-Muslims "whose presence, in their eyes, defiled the sacred soil of the Hejaz".

The massacre was discussed in the British House of Commons on 12 and 22 July 1858.

According to The Church Review (1859), the Jeddah population of about 5,000 was "often much increased by the influx of strangers", "the inhabitants are nearly all foreigners, or settlers from other parts of Arabia".

See also
 Istanbul pogrom
 Damascus affair (1840)
 Massacre of Aleppo (1850)
 1955 Madaba riot
 Christianity in the Ottoman Empire
 Christianity in Saudi Arabia (pre-Saudi History section)

References

Bibliography
 Freitag, Ulrike, "Symbolic Politics and Urban Violence in Late Ottoman Jeddah", in: Ulrike Freitag, Nelida Fuccaro, Claudia Ghrawi, Nora Lafi, Urban Violence in the Middle East: Changing Cityscapes in the Transition from Empire to Nation State, Berghahn Books, 2015
 Ochsenwald, William, 'The Jidda Massacre of 1858', Middle Eastern Studies, 13:3 (1977), 314–26
 Pétriat, Philippe, "D’une histoire locale à une histoire mondiale du massacre de Djedda (1858)", Vacarme, 1998/1 (n° 6)
 Pétriat, Philippe, "Fitna Djeddah", les Hadramis dans l'émeute du 15 juin 1858, Mémoire de Master 2, Université Paris-Sorbonne, 2010

1858 riots
1858 in the Ottoman Empire
June 1858 events
Massacres in 1858
Massacres in the Ottoman Empire
Persecution of Christians in the Ottoman Empire
Persecution of Greeks in the Ottoman Empire before the 20th century
History of Jeddah
Massacres of Christians
Massacres in Saudi Arabia
1858 murders in the Ottoman Empire